Scott Joseph Gordon (born April 6, 1988) is an American soccer player.

Career

College and amateur
Gordon grew up in Boca Raton, Florida, attended Spanish River High School, and began his college soccer career at Mercer University, transferring to Lynn University prior to his sophomore year in 2007. After missing all of 2008 due to injury Gordon returned to the field for his junior season in 2009, appearing in 12 games and receiving an All-Sunshine State Conference Honorable Mention. He finished his college career with 28 games, logging five goals, four assists and 14 points. He was a two-time All-Sunshine State Conference honoree, and collected NSCAA All-South Region recognition honors as a senior.

During his college years Gordon also played for the Baton Rouge Capitals in the USL Premier Development League, scoring one goal in 14 games and helping the Capitals to the PDL national playoff semi finals in 2010.

Professional
Gordon was drafted in the third round (53rd overall) of the 2011 MLS SuperDraft by FC Dallas, after a standout performance in a friendly organized by Ft. Lauderdale Strikers scout Marcelo Castillo vs the United States U20 national team just days before the MLS SuperDraft, but was not offered a professional contract by the team.

Gordon subsequently signed with the Fort Lauderdale Strikers of the North American Soccer League and made his professional debut—and scored his first professional goal—for the Strikers on April 29, 2011 in a 2–2 tie with the Puerto Rico Islanders.

On March 16, 2012, Chivas USA signed Gordon from the Fort Lauderdale Strikers.

Chivas USA waived Gordon on July 6, 2012.

Career statistics

Statistics accurate as of March 29, 2013

References

External links
 
 Lynn profile

1988 births
Living people
American soccer players
Lynn Fighting Knights men's soccer players
Baton Rouge Capitals players
Fort Lauderdale Strikers players
Chivas USA players
USL League Two players
North American Soccer League players
Major League Soccer players
FC Dallas draft picks
Soccer players from Florida
Sportspeople from Boca Raton, Florida
Association football defenders
Boca Raton FC players